The Acts of Uziah is a lost text that may have been written by Isaiah, who was one of King Uzziah's contemporaries. The passage reads: "Now the rest of the acts of Uzziah, first and last, did Isaiah the prophet, the son of Amoz, write."

This manuscript is sometimes called Second Isaiah or The Book by the prophet Isaiah.

See also
Table of books of Judeo-Christian Scripture
Lost books of the New Testament
Lost work

Lost Jewish texts